Stepwells (also known as vavs or baori) are wells or ponds with a long corridor of steps that descend to the water level. Stepwells played a significant role in defining subterranean architecture in western India from 7th to 19th century. Some stepwells are multi-storeyed and can be accessed by a Persian wheel which is pulled by a bull to bring water to the first or second floor. They are most common in western India and are also found in the other more arid regions of the Indian subcontinent, extending into Pakistan. The construction of stepwells is mainly utilitarian, though they may include embellishments of architectural significance, and be temple tanks.

Stepwells are examples of the many types of storage and irrigation tanks that were developed in India, mainly to cope with seasonal fluctuations in water availability. A basic difference between stepwells on the one hand, and tanks and wells on the other, is that stepwells make it easier for people to reach the groundwater and to maintain and manage the well.

The builders dug deep trenches into the earth for dependable, year-round groundwater. They lined the walls of these trenches with blocks of stone, without mortar, and created stairs leading down to the water. This led to the building of some significant ornamental and architectural features, often associated with dwellings and in urban areas. It also ensured their survival as monuments.

A stepwell structure consists of two sections: a vertical shaft from which water is drawn and the surrounding inclined subterranean passageways and the chambers and steps which provide access to the well. The galleries and chambers surrounding these wells were often carved profusely with elaborate detail and became cool, quiet retreats during the hot summers.

Names 

A number of distinct names, sometimes local, exist for stepwells. In Hindi-speaking regions, they include names based on baudi (including bawdi, bawri, bawari, baori, baoli, bavadi and bavdi). In Gujarati and Marwari language, they are usually called vav, vavri or vaav. Other names include kalyani or pushkarani (Kannada), baoli and barav.

History 

The stepwell may have originated during periods of drought to ensure enough access to the water. The earliest archaeological evidence of stepwells is found at Dholavira where the site also has water tanks or reservoirs with flights of steps. Mohenjo Daro's great bath is also provided with steps on opposite directions. Ashokan inscriptions mention construction of step wells along major Indian roads at a distance of every 8 kos for the convenience of travellers, but Ashoka states that it was a well established practice which predated him and was done by former kings as well.

The first rock-cut stepwells in India date from 200–400 AD. The earliest example of a bath-like pond reached by steps is found at Uperkot caves in Junagadh. These caves are dated to the 4th century. Navghan Kuvo, a well with the circular staircase in the vicinity, is another example. It was possibly built in Western Satrap (200–400 AD) or Maitraka (600–700 AD) period, though some place it as late as the 11th century. The nearby Adi Kadi Vav was constructed either in the second half of the 10th century or the 15th century.

The stepwells at Dhank in Rajkot district are dated to 550–625 AD. The stepped ponds at Bhinmal (850–950 AD) are followed by it. The stepwells were constructed in the southwestern region of Gujarat around 600 AD; from there they spread north to Rajasthan and subsequently to the north and west India. Initially used as an art form by Hindus, the construction of these stepwells hit its peak during Muslim rule from the 11th to 16th century.

One of the earliest existing examples of stepwells was built in the 11th century in Gujarat, the Mata Bhavani's Stepwell. A long flight of steps leads to the water below a sequence of multi-story open pavilions positioned along the east/west axis. The elaborate ornamentation of the columns, brackets and beams are a prime example of how stepwells were used as a form of art.

The Mughal emperors did not disrupt the culture that was practiced in these stepwells and encouraged the building of stepwells. The authorities during the British Raj found the hygiene of the stepwells less than desirable and installed pipe and pump systems to replace their purpose.

Location of a stepwell 
A stepwell is generally located in three types of places - as an extension or part of a temple, in or at an edge of a village, and/or the outskirts of a village. When a stepwell is associated with a temple or a shrine, it is either at the opposite wall of it or in front of the temple. Sindhvai Mata stepwell in Patan, Mata Bhavani stepwell in Ahmedabad, and the Ankol Mata stepwell in Davad serve as a great example of the stepwells that house shrines.

Function and use
The stepwell ensures the availability of water during periods of drought. The stepwells had social, cultural and religious significance. These stepwells were proven to be well-built sturdy structures, after withstanding earthquakes. Most places in India where there is abundant fresh water only during the monsoon season, stepwell and wells play a critical role in serving as a direct means to fresh water filtered through the earth. While the rivers, rivulets, creeks, and other natural water bodies dry up in this climate zone, stepwell and wells remain at a depth where there is less exposure to sun and heat. The majority of surviving stepwells originally served a leisure purpose alongside being main source of water for basic needs like bathing, washing clothes, farming, and watering animals. Stepwells also served as a place for social gatherings and religious ceremonies. Usually, women were more associated with these wells because they were the ones who collected the water. Also, it was they who prayed and offered gifts to the goddess of the well for her blessings.

The well-water is known to attract insects, animals, and many other germ breeding organisms. These stepwells, being a common space in frequent use by the inhabitants of the area, were considered to be a source of spreading epidemics and diseases.

Details 
Many stepwells have ornamentation and details as elaborate as those of Hindu temples. Proportions in relationship to the human body were used in their design, as they were in many other structures in Indian architecture.

Stepped ponds

Stepped ponds are very similar to stepwells in terms of purpose. Generally, stepped ponds accompany nearby temples while stepwells are more isolated. Stepwells are dark and barely visible from the surface, while stepped ponds are illuminated by the light from the sun. Stepwells are quite linear in design compared to the rectangular shape of stepped ponds.

In India
A number of surviving stepwells can be found across India, including in Rajasthan, Gujarat, Delhi, Madhya Pradesh, Maharashtra, and North Karnataka (Karnataka). In 2016 a collaborative mapping project, Stepwell Atlas, started to map GPS coordinates and collate information on stepwells, mapping over 2800 stepwells in India.  Another project mapped the location of over 1700 stepwells in Maharashtra.

In his book Delhi Heritage: Top 10 Baolis, Vikramjit Singh Rooprai mentions that Delhi alone has 32 stepwells. Out of these, 16 are lost, but their locations can be traced. Of the remaining 16, only 14 are accessible to public and the water level in these keeps varying, while two are now permanently dry.

Significant stepwells include:

 Agrasen ki Baoli, New Delhi
 Rajon ki baoli, New Delhi
 Chand Baori in Abhaneri near Jaipur, Rajasthan
 Rani ki vav at Patan, Gujarat
 Adalaj ni Vav at Adalaj, Gandhinagar, Gujarat
 Dada Harir Stepwell, Ahmedbad
 Navghan Kuvo and Adi Kadi vav, Uparkot Fort, Junagadh
 Toor Ji Ka Jhalra Baori, Jodhpur
 Birkha Bawari, Jodhpur
 Shahi Baoli, Lucknow
 Raniji ki Baori in Bundi, Rajasthan; Bundi has over 60 baolis in and around the town.
 Panna Meena ka Kund, Amer, India
 Udoji ki Baori, Mandholi, Rajasthan
 Kalyani, Hulikere
 Bhoga Nandeeshwara Temple, Karnataka
 Sree Peralassery Temple, Kerala
 Charthana Stepwell, Parbhani, Maharashtra
 Pingli Stepwell, Parbhani, Maharashtra
 Arvi Stepwell, Parbhani, Maharashtra
 Bansilalpet Stepwell

In Pakistan

Stepwells from Mughal periods still exist in Pakistan.  Some are in preserved conditions while others are not.

 Rohtas Fort, near Jhelum
 Wan Bhachran, near Mianwali
 Losar Baoli, near Islamabad
 Makli Baoli, near Thatta

Influence

Stepwells influenced many other structures in Indian architecture, especially those that incorporate water into their design. For example, the Aram Bagh in Agra was the first Mughal garden in India. It was designed by the Mughal emperor Babur and reflected his notion of paradise not only through water and landscaping but also through symmetry by including a reflecting pool in the design. He was inspired by stepwells and felt that one would complement the garden of his palace. Many other Mughal gardens include reflecting pools to enhance the landscape or serving as an elegant entrance. Other notable gardens in India which incorporate water into their design include:

 Humayun's Tomb, Nizamuddin East, Delhi
 Taj Mahal, Agra
 Mehtab Bagh, Agra
 Safdarjung's Tomb
 Shalimar Bagh (Srinagar), Jammu and Kashmir
 Nishat Gardens, Jammu and Kashmir
 Yadvindra Gardens, Pinjore
 Khusro Bagh, Allahabad
 Roshanara Bagh

Gallery

See also
 Check dam
 Dhunge dhara
 Ghat
 History of stepwells in Gujarat
 Johad
 Liman
 Subak (irrigation)
 Taanka
 Tube well
 Water well

Notes

References
Rima Hooja: "Channeling Nature: Hydraulics, Traditional Knowledge Systems, And Water Resource Management in India – A Historical Perspective". At infinityfoundation.com
 Livingston, Morna & Beach, Milo (2002). Steps to Water: The Ancient Stepwells of India. Princeton Architectural Press. .
 Vikramjit Singh Rooprai. Delhi Heritage: Top 10 Baolis (2019). Niyogi Books. .
Jutta Jain Neubauer The Stepwells of Gujarat: An art-historical Perspective  (2001)
Philip Davies, The Penguin guide to the monuments of India, Vol II (London: Viking, 1989)
Christopher Tadgell, The History of Architecture in India (London: Phaidon Press, 1990)
Abhilash Shekhawat, "Stepwells of Gujarat." India's Invitation. 2010. Web. 29 March 2012.<http://www.indiasinvitation.com/stepwells_of_gujarat/>.

External links

Stepwell Atlas
Stepwells of India
Agrasen ki Baoli
Stepwell architecture
Stepwell on Oxfort Art Online
India's Forgotten Stepwells at ArchDaily

Irrigation
Rajasthani architecture
Water wells
Buildings and structures in Gujarat
 
Architecture in India
Architecture in Pakistan
Ponds
Subterranean buildings and structures